Curtis Randall Reitz (born November 20, 1929) is the Algernon Sydney Biddle Professor of Law at the University of Pennsylvania Law School.

Biography
Reitz was born in Reading, Pennsylvania. His father was a jeweler, and his mother was a teacher. He attended Reading High School.

He received his A.B. in History from the University of Pennsylvania in 1951 (Phi Beta Kappa). He then spent two years in the armed forces during the Korean War. Reitz then earned his LL.B. summa cum laude from the University of Pennsylvania Law School in 1956. He served as the editor-in-chief of the University of Pennsylvania Law Review from 1955 to 1956. At Penn Law he was a student of A. Leo Levin, and a research assistant for Professor Louis B. Schwartz. He then worked as a law clerk to United States Supreme Court Chief Justice Earl Warren from 1956 to 1957. 

He is the Algernon Sydney Biddle Professor of Law at the University of Pennsylvania Law School. He has taught at the law school since 1957. The Penn Law Class of 1968 created the Class of 1968 Scholarship Fund Honoring Curtis R. Reitz, which provides financial support to LL.M. students at the school.

Reitz has represented Pennsylvania for 25 years in the National Conference of Commissioners on Uniform State Laws, and is chair of the Conference's Committee on International Legal Developments. He also participated in the recent revision of the Uniform Commercial Code. His recent work has focused on international commercial law, including aspects of the World Trade Organization's operations.

Selected publications
Cases and Materials on International Regulation of Trade and Investment (2006)
Sales and Transactions: Domestic and International Law (3d ed. 2006)
The Law of Sales and Secured Financing (with John Honnold, Steven L. Harris, and Charles W. Mooney Jr.) (7th ed. 2002)
Cases, Problems and Materials on Sales Transactions: Domestic and International Law (with John Honnold) (1992)
Construction Lenders' Liability to Contractors, Subcontractors, and Materialmen, in Construction Litigation (K. Cushman, Ed. 1981)
Federal Habeas Corpus: Impact of an Abortive State Proceeding, 74 Harv. L. Rev. 1315 (1961)

See also 
 List of law clerks of the Supreme Court of the United States (Chief Justice)

References

External links
 Curtis R. Reitz - Algernon Sydney Biddle Professor, Emeritus. University of Pennsylvania. Accessed 2011-03-11.
 CURTIS R. REITZ. University of Pennsylvania. Accessed 2011-03-11.

Law clerks of the Supreme Court of the United States
University of Pennsylvania Law School faculty
University of Pennsylvania Law School alumni
International law scholars
1929 births
Living people
American legal scholars
Scholars of contract law
Scholars of criminal law
People from Reading, Pennsylvania
American military personnel of the Korean War